Early immersion is a method of teaching and learning a foreign language.  It entails having a student undergo intense instruction in a foreign language, starting by age five or six.  Frequently, this method entails having the student learn all or much of his or her various "regular" subject matter (such as mathematics and science) via the foreign language being taught.

It has been found that students enrolled in an early-immersion program learn the language being taught at an almost-native proficiency by age 11.  Such students do show a lagging behind their peers (that is, those peers who are not enrolled in an early-immersion program) in reading, spelling, punctuation, mathematics, and science for the first few years.  However, such immersion-enrolled students do eventually catch up with their peers in the aforementioned areas (Baker, 1993).

Critical period hypothesis 

Various theories have been purported as to why early childhood is the "easiest" time to learn a language — the developmental period when language seems to be "absorbed" as opposed to "learned".  However, much debate still remains as to how the brain acquires language, including why the brain seems to have the easiest time with it in early childhood.

See also
Language immersion
Language acquisition

References
Baker, C. (1993). Foundations of Bilingual Education and Bilingualism.

External links

www.eurolanguageholidays.com[Immersion language learning]

Language immersion

Early childhood education